James Webster (23 January 1886 – 14 December 1951) was a British wrestler. He competed in the men's freestyle featherweight at the 1908 Summer Olympics.

References

External links
 

1886 births
1951 deaths
British male sport wrestlers
Olympic wrestlers of Great Britain
Wrestlers at the 1908 Summer Olympics
Place of birth missing